Matías Rojas may refer to:

 Matías Rojas (footballer, born 1989), Argentine forward for Ñublense
 Matías Rojas (footballer, born 1991), Argentine midfielder for Deportivo Santaní
 Matías Rojas (footballer, born 1995), Paraguayan midfielder for Racing Club
 Matías Rojas (footballer, born 1996), Chilean defender for Provincial Ovalle Fútbol Club